Idiophthalma is a genus of South American brushed trapdoor spiders first described by O. Pickard-Cambridge in 1877.

Species
 it contains five species:
Idiophthalma amazonica Simon, 1889 – Brazil
Idiophthalma ecuadorensis Berland, 1913 – Ecuador
Idiophthalma pantherina Simon, 1889 – Venezuela
Idiophthalma robusta Simon, 1889 – Ecuador
Idiophthalma suspecta O. Pickard-Cambridge, 1877 (type) – Colombia

References

Barychelidae
Mygalomorphae genera
Spiders of South America